The 2020–21 Gibraltar National League season is the second season of the new Gibraltar National League in Gibraltar, and the 122nd season of football on the territory overall. There are no reigning champions this season, as the previous season was declared abandoned as a result of the COVID-19 pandemic. The league is due to kick off on 16 October 2020. Instead of qualifying for the 2021–22 UEFA Europa League, teams placed 2nd, 3rd and the 2021 Rock Cup winners will qualify for the inaugural UEFA Europa Conference League.

Format
The structure of the league will follow that of the previous season. Teams will play one round of games as a single league, before splitting into two groups: the Championship Group contested by the top 6 sides, and the Challenge Group between the bottom 6 sides. The winners of the Challenge Group will receive the GFA Challenge Trophy and receive a bye to the second round of the next season's Rock Cup. The league paused after the game on 20 December between Bruno's Magpies and St Joseph's, but resumed on 22 February 2021 with Lions Gibraltar defeating College 1975 3-2.

Teams

The following 12 teams began the 2020–21 Gibraltar National League. League positions from the previous season represent where teams stood when the season was abandoned.

Note: Flags indicate national team as has been defined under FIFA eligibility rules. Players may hold more than one non-FIFA nationality.

Managerial Changes

League table

Results

Forfeits for Home Grown Player violations 
The season suffered early controversy when several teams were forced to forfeit games for violations of the Home Grown Player rule, due to confusion over the new rules regarding time limits for changes if a Home Grown Player is sent off. Below are the games that have been forfeited for rule breaches.

Additionally, Boca Gibraltar failed to field a team on 5 December 2020 against Mons Calpe, subsequently forfeiting the tie. After doing so again on 9 December, they were expelled from the league.

Championship and Challenge groups
After 11 games (reduced to 10 after Boca Gibraltar were expelled) the league splits into two groups: the top 6 into the Championship Group, and the bottom 6 (later reduced to 5) into the Challenge Group. The Championship Group will compete for the league title and European qualification places, while the Challenge Group will compete for the GFA Challenge Trophy.

Championship Group

Championship Group results

Challenge Group

Challenge Group results

Season statistics

Scoring

Top scorers

Hat-tricks

Clean Sheets

Awards

Player of the week

Monthly awards

See also
2020–21 Gibraltar Intermediate League
2020–21 Gibraltar Women's Football League

References

External links
Gibraltar Football Association

Gibraltar National League seasons
Gib
1